Nou Barris ("nine neighbourhoods") is one of the ten districts into which Barcelona has been officially divided since 1984. The name refers to the original nine neighbourhoods it was composed of, even though nowadays it's made up of thirteen. It covers an area of 8.04 km2.

It is located in the northern part of the city adjacent to two other districts of Barcelona: Sant Andreu and Horta-Guinardó and grew up extensively out of small urbanised areas near the former municipalities of Sant Joan d'Horta and Sant Andreu de Palomar (now neighbourhoods of Barcelona) in the 20th century, especially from the 1950s on. The district council is located in a former mental institution, the Institut Mental de la Santa Creu.

Neighbourhoods
It is further divided into these neighbourhoods:
 Can Peguera
 Canyelles
 Ciutat Meridiana
 La Guineueta
 Porta
 La Prosperitat
 Les Roquetes
 Torre Baró
 La Trinitat Nova
 El Turó de la Peira
 Vallbona
 Verdum
 Vilapicina i la Torre Llobeta

Demographics
In 1998 it had 168,837 inhabitants, having lost over 20,000 people from a population peak in 1991. It's the district of Barcelona with the largest Romani community. In 2005 the population went down again, with 164.981 inhabitants. Since 2000 it's become one of the areas of the city with the strongest presence of immigrants, especially from Romania, Ukraine and Ecuador, and has been largely rehabilitated by the city council. Its density is 20.520 inhabitants/km2.

See also
Districts of Barcelona

 Street names in Barcelona
 Urban planning of Barcelona

External links

Nou Barris at the city council site
NouBarris.net

 
Districts of Barcelona
Romani communities in Spain